William Werner House is a historic home located at Lititz, Lancaster County, Pennsylvania. It was built in 1762, and is a -story, four bay frame dwelling on a stone foundation. It has a steep gable roof and is in the Georgian style. It measure 30 feet wide by 36 feet deep. A rear addition and two front dormers were added in 1849.

It was listed on the National Register of Historic Places in 1984. It is located in the Lititz Moravian Historic District.

References

Houses on the National Register of Historic Places in Pennsylvania
Georgian architecture in Pennsylvania
Houses completed in 1762
Houses in Lancaster County, Pennsylvania
Lititz, Pennsylvania
National Register of Historic Places in Lancaster County, Pennsylvania
Historic district contributing properties in Pennsylvania